Ilyakshide (İläkşiźe) is a rural locality (a village) in Bishkurayevsky Selsoviet, Ilishevsky District, Bashkortostan, Russia. The population was 240 as of 2010. There are 2 streets.

Geography 
Ilyakshide is located 33 km southeast of Verkhneyarkeyevo (the district's administrative centre) by road. Bishkurayevo is the nearest rural locality.

References 

Rural localities in Ilishevsky District
Belebeyevsky Uyezd